MBC TV is a South Korean free-to-air television channel and is considered the first private company in South Korea launched on 8 August 1969 and owned by Munhwa Broadcasting Corporation.

History 

On 21 February 1961, the Seoul Private Broadcasting Corporation was established. On 22 June 1966, the company received a broadcasting license from the government and started broadcasting on terrestrial television on 8 August 1969. On 5 October 1970, MBC Newsdesk was launched as the network's newscast. A year later, on 10 January 1971, the names of all regional broadcasters were merged under the MBC brand. On 22 December 1980, colour transmissions began in Seoul alone, followed by a nationwide adopting on 1 January 1981.

Together with its main rivals KBS and SBS, MBC TV began its full-scale daytime broadcasting on 1 December 2005. It went on to broadcast 24 hours a day on 1 January 2013 and discontinued on 30 December 2017. As of 4 August 2014, the channel news program began to be broadcast from the new television station located in Sangam, and from 1 September of that same year, the channel began to produce all the programs in the new studios.

Programming 

MBC dramas are exported to 100 countries in Asia, the Middle East, Africa and the Americas. Dae Jang Geum has high audience ratings in China, Taiwan and Hong Kong; its popularity has continued in 91 countries, including Japan. Other dramas that have enjoyed high viewership include Jumong, Coffee Prince, Moon Embracing the Sun, Yi San, Queen Seondeok, and Dong Yi.

Infotainment shows and documentaries 
MBC documentaries encompass a wide range of issues, from foreign affairs to the environment. PD Notebook premiered in 1990, and has since earned notoriety for its investigations from a journalistic standpoint. Episodes have included one covering scientific fraud by Korean geneticist Hwang Woo-suk, and another containing arguments against importing US beef. The latter episode, entitled "Is American Beef Really Safe from Mad Cow Disease?", contributed to three months of protest in Seoul against importing US beef. Since then, the accuracy of the episode and the program's method of obtaining information has been questioned.

MBC current-affairs and documentary programs have won recognition from the New York and Banff TV Festivals, the Asian TV Awards, ABU Prizes, Earth Vision and the Japan Wildlife Festival.

News 
MBC News now has 18 local news bureaus and 8 overseas news bureaus, with which it signed a news supply contract with CNN, APTN, NBC and Reuters TV so it can bring up to date news to viewers.  MBC currently offers a wide variety of in-depth analysis programs on politics, economy, society, and culture through Current Affairs Magazine 2580, 100 Minute Debate, Economy Magazine M, and Unification Observatory.

Sports 
MBC broadcasts Los Angeles Dodgers, Pittsburgh Pirates and Texas Rangers games when Hyun-jin Ryu pitches and Shin-soo Choo and Jung-ho Kang bat.

Controversies

1999 — PD Note incident 
In 1999, Munhwa Broadcasting Corporation aired PD Note, a documentary program criticizing Jaerock Lee. Members of the Manmin Central Church forcibly entered the TV station and cut off the power supply in the control room, interrupting the programme several times. Meanwhile, other supporters, numbering between 1,500 and 2,000 according to different sources, blocked off nearby roads. Manmin Central Church members later filed a lawsuit against the TV station. Three church leaders and eight members of the church were sentenced to jail for between two and a half years and three years, for their roles in the protests.

2005 — Live Music Camp incident 
On Saturday, July 30, 2005, Rux was invited to appear on the MBC concert program Live Music Camp for their segment called “Is this song good?” The band members invited a large number of their supporters in the punk scene.

Toward the end of the performance, two punks disrobed and leapt around the stage in front of the live audience and the cameras. Between four and five seconds of full-frontal nudity was broadcast across the nation. The two streakers were mistakenly identified as members of the band Couch, although one was from Spiky Brats. Both were booked by the police without detention on charges of indecency and interference with a business. The police administered drug tests, but the results were negative. Won was also arrested for inviting the two to appear on the show.

Public response was furious, both against Rux and the broadcaster. MBC cancelled Music Camp, and the Korean Broadcasting Commission considered heavy disciplinary measures. Then mayor of Seoul, Lee Myung-bak suggested that Hongdae concerts be regulated by authorities, which prompted political rivals to compare Lee to former dictator Park Chung-hee.

2008–2010 — PD Note

Mad cow disease 
On 27 April 2008, PD Note televised an episode called "Is American Beef Really Safe from Mad Cow Disease?" which covered mad cow disease and alleged dangers associated with American beef.  The South Korean Ministry of Agriculture and Fisheries filed a legal suit against the producers as it announced that the program was distorted and exaggerated. The producers were exonerated by the Seoul Central District Court and the Supreme Court in 2010.

Prosecutors and sponsors 
On April 20, 2010, PD Note televised an episode called "The prosecutors and sponsors" which investigates how Korean prosecutors are "sponsored" by businesses, receiving bribes in the form of money, drinks and women.  They began the investigation after receiving information from a man about 57 former prosecutors being "sponsored."  As the episode was well received by the audience, the second episode was broadcast on June 8, 2010.

Four Major Rivers 
The Korean Ministry of Land, Transport and Maritime Affairs applied for an injunction to stop the airing of a PD Note episode, "The Six-Meter-Deep Secret of the Four Major Rivers," which was scheduled to be broadcast on August 17, 2010.  The episode deals with a controversy about The Four Major Rivers Project launched by the Korean government in 2009, which is aimed at developing water resources by securing a sufficient water supply, preventing floods, upgrading water quality and reviving ecosystems, as well as boosting regional economies.  Based on PD Note’s report on the episode which had already been released, the Ministry insisted that the episode contained false information. They requested that the Seoul Southern District Court stop further spread of the false information among the public. Their request was dismissed and the episode aired August 24, 2010. According to the producers of PD Note, the MBC management also requested that they postpone the episode.

2013 — Show! Music Core ranking

2020 — Deepfake pornography 
On 20 April 2020, MBC News broadcast news about deepfake pornography. MBC used deepfake technology, an AI technology which changes an identity of someone on an image or a video to someone else's likeness. The news sparked outrage among Korean netizens due to its contents which consist of inappropriate materials. Korean boy band BTS, Korean singer IU and other celebrities were used as examples on the news. Viewers and fans of the celebrities used the hashtag #MBC_합성_사과해, to tell MBC to apologise or respond to the incident; it did neither.

2021 — Olympics broadcast 
During the broadcasting of the parade of nations on the 2020 Summer Olympics opening ceremony, MBC was accused domestically and internationally for making depictions of numerous countries that were deemed racist and offensive. The most notable country depictions displayed during the broadcast is the use of the Chernobyl disaster to depict Ukraine and riots to depict Haiti. The incident sparked anger among Ukrainians and Haitians. On 27 July, MBC president Park Sung-jae apologised to the public as well as nations affected. He apologised to the Embassy of Ukraine and Romania in Seoul in a press conference and promised to ensure all of its content to be respectful towards universal values and cultural diversity. MBC also declared a written apology on their official website. Haitian Foreign Affairs Minister Claude Joseph fired back at MBC, saying "their apology didn't go far enough, but the incident shouldn't be allowed to distract from the athletes who have worked tirelessly for years to get to the Olympics". The incident caused national uproar among Koreans, with some Korean netizens accusing MBC for being insensitive and unprofessional.

See also 
 MBC Standard FM
 SBS TV
 Channel A

References

External links 
 MBC TV schedule

Television channels in South Korea
Korean-language television stations
Munhwa Broadcasting Corporation television networks
Television channels and stations established in 1969